Always a New Beginning is a 1974 American documentary film directed by John D. Goodell, about the founding and operation of The Institutes for the Achievement of Human Potential. It was nominated for an Academy Award for Best Documentary Feature.

References

External links

1974 films
1974 documentary films
American documentary films
American independent films
Documentary films about health care
1974 independent films
1970s English-language films
1970s American films